First-seeded Roy Emerson defeated Fred Stolle 6–3, 6–4, 6–2 in the final to win the men's singles tennis title at the 1964 Australian Championships.

Seeds
The seeded players are listed below. Roy Emerson is the champion; others show the round in which they were eliminated.

  Roy Emerson (champion)
  Fred Stolle (finalist)
  John Newcombe (quarterfinals)
  Ken Fletcher (semifinals)
  Bob Hewitt (third round)
  Martin Mulligan (semifinals)
  Tony Roche (quarterfinals)
  Owen Davidson (quarterfinals)
  Mike Sangster (quarterfinals)
  Roger Taylor (third round)
  Eugene Scott (second round)
  Graham Stilwell (third round)

Draw

Key
 Q = Qualifier
 WC = Wild card
 LL = Lucky loser
 r = Retired

Finals

Earlier rounds

Section 1

Section 2

Section 3

Section 4

External links
 1964 Australian Championships on australianopen.com, the source for this draw

1964 in tennis
1964
1964 in Australian tennis